Lisowo  is a village in the administrative district of Gmina Drohiczyn, within Siemiatycze County, Podlaskie Voivodeship, in north-eastern Poland.

According to the 1921 census, the village was inhabited by 304 people, among whom 290 were Roman Catholic, 8 Orthodox, and 6 Mosaic. At the same time, 299 inhabitants declared Polish nationality, 5 Belarusian. There were 37 residential buildings in the village.

References

Lisowo